Rani in Indian Subcontinent and Southeast Asia, sometimes spelled Ranee, is a Hindu/Sanskrit feminine given name. The term is the female form of the term for princely rulers in South and Southeast Asia and applies equally to the wife of a Raja or Rana. In some cases, British-Indian descendants are also tagged with "rani" attached to their first name.

Notable people named Rani 
 Rani (Pakistani actress) (born December 8, 1946 – died May 27, 1993), Pakistani actress and model
 Rani Bhabani (born 1716 – died 1795), Indian philanthropist and zamindar
 Rani Chandra (born October 12, 1976), Indian actress and winner of the Miss Kerala pageant
 Rani Chatterjee (born November 3, 1984), Indian actress, dancer and presenter
 Rani Chitralekha Bhonsle (born February 26, 1941), Indian political and social worker
 Rani Gaidinliu (born January 26, 1915 – died February 17, 1993), Indian activist, spiritual and political leader
 Rani Hamid (born 1944), Bangladeshi chess player
 Rani Kamalesvaran (born 1971), an Australian singer, popular in the late 1990s
 Rani Karnaa (born 1939), Indian dancer
 Rani Khedira (born January 27, 1994), German footballer
 Rani Mukerji (born March 21, 1978), Indian actress
 Rani Mundiasti (born October 4, 1984), Indonesian badminton player
 Anita Rani Nazran (born 25 October 1977), English radio and television presenter
 Rani Price (born January 29, 1974), English television presenter
 Rani Rampal (born December 4, 1994), Indian field hockey player
 Rani Rashmoni (born 1793 – died 1861), Indian activist, businesswoman, philanthropist, zamindars and founder of the Dakshineswar Kali Temple
 Rani Sharone (born 1978), American bassist and guitarist
 Rani Shiromani, Indian Revolutionary and Tribal Queen
 Rani Taj (born October 3, 1993), British-Pakistani dhol player
 Rani Maria Vattalil (born January 29, 1954 – died February 25, 1995), Indian catholic religious, activist and missionary social worker
 Rani Vijaya Devi (born August 28, 1922 – died December 8, 2005), Indian princess and musician
 Rani Yahya (born September 12, 1984), Brazilian mixed martial artist and Brazilian jiu-jitsu practitioner

Notable people named Ranee 
 Ranee Brylinski (born 1957), American mathematician
 Ranee Campen, Thai-British actress
 Ranee Lee (born 1942), Canadian jazz vocalist and musician
 Ranee Narah (born 1965), Indian politician

Notable people surnamed Rani 
 Devika Rani (born March 30, 1908 – died March 9, 1994), Indian actress, singer and textile designer
 Krishna Rani (born 2001), Bangladeshi footballer
 Pooja Rani (born February 17, 1991), Indian boxer

Fictional characters 
 The Rani, from the British science-fiction television series Doctor Who.
 Rani Chandra, from 2007's British science fiction television The Sarah Jane Adventures.
 Rani, from the Disney franchise Disney Fairies.
 Rani Kapoor, from the Australian soap opera Neighbours.
 The Rani of Cooch Naheen, from Salman Rushdie's novel, Midnight's Children.
 Rani, the leader of the Night Pride and love interest of Kion in The Lion Guard.

See also
 Prabhu, Sanskrit for "prince".
 Queen regnant
 Rani, Rajasthan

Hindu given names
Bangladeshi feminine given names
Indian feminine given names
Royal titles
Titles in India
Unisex given names